Johnny Simm (born 24 November 1929) is an English former professional footballer who played as a winger, making 143 appearances in the Football League for Bolton Wanderers, Bury and Bradford City.

References

1929 births
Living people
English footballers
Bolton Wanderers F.C. players
Bury F.C. players
Bradford City A.F.C. players
English Football League players
People from Ashton-in-Makerfield
Association football midfielders